Joen Danielsen Known as Kvívíks-Jógvan (Jógvan of Kvívík), (11 June 1843, Kvívík, Faroe Islands – 2 May 1926).  He married and settled in the town of Gjógv.

Kvívíks-Jógvan was one of the earliest traditional Faroese poets to write poems in the Faroese language. Growing up together with J. P. Gregoriussen in the town of Kvívík when V. U. Hammershaimb was parish priest there, he taught himself to read Faroese by borrowing books from Mr. Hammershaimb.

Among the many poems he wrote, Jógvan also wrote traditional Faroese ballads, the most famous being "Kópakvæðið" (the ballad of the Selkie or seal woman) which consists of 68 verses.  This ballad is based on a Faroese legend about seals coming ashore to dance in human appearance on 7 January, which locally is known as "old christmas" which was celebrated in accordance with the Gregorian calendar.

Works 
 Yrkingar. 1926 (Poems and Ballads, in Faroese)

External links
 Kvívíks-Jógvan

19th-century Faroese people
1843 births
1926 deaths
Faroese male poets
Faroese songwriters
Faroese-language poets
People from Kvívík